I Get It In may refer to
 "I Get It In" (50 Cent song), a song by American recording artist 50 Cent
 "I Get It In" (Omarion song), a song by American recording artist Omarion